Ballingarry (13 April 1999 – 16 April 2020) was a Thoroughbred racehorse who competed for owners in Europe and North America. Bred and raced by the principals of Coolmore Stud, he was named for the village of Ballingarry in the southern part of County Tipperary in Ireland. In October 2002, he was sold to an American racing partnership led by Sidney L. Port.

Ballingarry's most important wins came at age two in the Group One Critérium de Saint-Cloud at Saint-Cloud Racecourse in France and at age three in the Grade 1 Canadian International Stakes at Woodbine Racetrack in Toronto. Following his purchase by Sidney Port, Ballingarry notably won back-to-back editions of the Stars and Stripes Breeders' Cup Turf Handicap at Chicago's Arlington Park.

Retired to stud duty, since 2005 Ballingarry has been standing at Charles-Henri de Moussac's Haras du Mezeray in Ticheville, Lower Normandy, France. Died on 16 April 2020.

Pedigree

References
 Ballingarry's pedigree and partial racing stats

1999 racehorse births
2020 racehorse deaths
Racehorses bred in Ireland
Racehorses trained in Ireland
Racehorses trained in the United States
Thoroughbred family 16-g